This is a list of United Nations Security Council Resolutions 901 to 1000 adopted between 4 March 1994 and 23 June 1995.

See also 
 Lists of United Nations Security Council resolutions
 List of United Nations Security Council Resolutions 801 to 900
 List of United Nations Security Council Resolutions 1001 to 1100

0901